Torres de Berrellén is a municipality located in the province of Zaragoza, Aragon, Spain. According to the 2004 census (INE), the municipality has a population of 1450 inhabitants. Its population density is 28,08 inhabitants per square kilometre (70/sq mi).

Geography 
Torres de Berellén is located by where the river Jalón becomes a tributary of the main Ebro river. The town belongs to the province of Zaragoza, and it borders Tauste and Pradilla de Ebro north; Remolinos, Alcalá de Ebro and Cabañas de Ebro west; Alagón and La Joyosa south and Sobradiel and Zaragoza east.

Politics

Election results

Demography

Demographic evolution of Torres de Berrellén

History 
The town's name has its origins in a local word for agriculture houses (torres), which started to being built in this place in the 12th century by people from El Castellar.

Twin cities 
  Escalquens, France

References

Municipalities in the Province of Zaragoza